The field hockey event for the 2010 Commonwealth Games was held at the Dhyan Chand National Stadium from 4 October to 14 October 2010.

Men's tournament

Medalists

Women's tournament

Medalists

References 

 
2010 Commonwealth Games events
Commonwealth Games
2010
2010